Gadir Rustamov (3 March 1935 – 14 December 2011) was an Azerbaijani mugham singer. He was taught mugham by Hajibaba Huseynov. He received the title of National Artist of Azerbaijan in 1992.

References

1935 births
2011 deaths
20th-century Azerbaijani male singers
Azerbaijani educators
People from Agdam
Mugham singers